Peter Nicholas Williams (born 14 December 1958) is an English-born former physical education, and history teacher, a physiotherapist and dual-code international rugby union, and professional rugby league footballer who played in the 1980s and 1990s. Peter Williams was the second footballer, after Thomas Woods, to play rugby union for England, and rugby league for Wales.

Background
Peter Williams was born in Wigan, Lancashire, England.

Rugby union playing career
Williams won caps for England (RU) while at Orrell in the 1987 Five Nations Championship against Scotland and in the 1987 Rugby World Cup against Australia, Japan, and Wales.

Rugby league playing career
Williams won 2 caps (plus 1 as substitute) for Wales (RL) in 1992 while at Salford, and won caps for Great Britain (RL) while at Salford in 1989 against France (2 matches).

County Cup Final appearances
Williams played  (replaced by interchange/substitute Ian Blease) in Salford's 17–22 defeat by Wigan in the 1988 Lancashire County Cup Final during the 1988–89 season at Knowsley Road, St. Helens on Sunday 23 October 1988. and played left-, i.e. number 4, and scored a try in the 24-18 defeat by Widnes in the 1990 Lancashire County Cup Final during the 1990–91 season at Central Park, Wigan on Saturday 29 September 1990.

Genealogical information
Williams is the son of the Llanelli RFC (RU) Prop and Wigan (RL)  of the 1950s, Roy Williams.

References

External links
!Great Britain Statistics at englandrl.co.uk (statistics currently missing due to not having appeared for both Great Britain, and England)

1958 births
Living people
Dual-code rugby internationals
England international rugby union players
English people of Welsh descent
English rugby union players
English rugby league players
Great Britain national rugby league team players
Lancashire County RFU players
North of England Rugby Union team
People educated at Upholland Grammar School
Rugby league players from Wigan
Rugby league centres
Rugby union fly-halves
Rugby union players from Wigan
Salford Red Devils players
Wales national rugby league team players